Saalbach may refer to:

 Saalbach-Hinterglemm, an Austrian municipality
 Saalbach (Rhine), of Baden-Württemberg, Germany, tributary of the Rhine
 Saalbach (Gelpe), a river of North Rhine-Westphalia, Germany, tributary of the Gelpe

People with the surname
 Astrid Saalbach (born 1955), Danish playwright and novelist